William Henry Duckworth (October 21, 1894 – August 9, 1969) was a justice of the Supreme Court of Georgia from 1938 to 1948, and chief justice from 1948 to 1969.

Born in Blairsville, Georgia to John Francis Duckworth and Laura Jane Woods, Duckworth attended Young Harris College from 1915 to 1917, then served in the United States Navy Reserve during World War I, in 1918. He read law in a law office to be admitted to the State Bar of Georgia in 1919, and engaged in the private practice of law in Cairo, Georgia from 1919 to 1937. He then served as assistant Attorney General of Georgia from 1937 to 1938, when he became an associate justice of the Supreme Court of Georgia.

Duckworth married Willabel Pilcher, with whom he had 3 children. He died in Decatur, Georgia.

References

Justices of the Supreme Court of Georgia (U.S. state)
1894 births
1969 deaths
Young Harris College alumni
Chief Justices of the Supreme Court of Georgia (U.S. state)
People from Blairsville, Georgia
United States Navy reservists
U.S. state supreme court judges admitted to the practice of law by reading law
20th-century American judges